The Manka are a partly Muslim and partly Hindu community found in the state of Gujarat in India.

History and origin
The Manka are said to get their name from their profession of making  manka, which in the Gujrati language, means the making of prayer beads. They claim to be Chavda Rajputs. The community is said to have come from Sindh and are now found mainly in twenty villages of Bachau and Rapar talukas of Kutch District. Some of the Manka are found in Jam Salaya district Jamnagar in Saurashtra who are mainly in fishing and seafaring work.

Present circumstances

The Manka speak a dialect of Kutchi, with substantial Sindhi loan words. The Manka consist of a number of clans, the main ones being the Jabayi, Chunctria, Jesra, Payana, Chavda and Sinayi. The community is split along religious lines, with the Bhuj Manka being Muslim. They resemble other Kutch Muslim communities in social, ritual and religious activity. The Manka are an endogamous community, and marriages between the clans is the norm. Land is a major economic source, and agriculture is their traditional occupation.

See also

Kathi

References

Social groups of Gujarat
Tribes of Kutch
Muslim communities of India
Rajput clans of Gujarat
Sindhi tribes in India